Hameh Ja (also Romanized as Hameh Jā) is a village in Asara Rural District, Asara District, Karaj County, Alborz Province, Iran. At the 2006 census, its population was 335, in 107 families.

References 

Populated places in Karaj County